Cottonwoods is an unincorporated community in southwestern Manitoba, Canada. It is located in the Rural Municipality of Cornwallis, approximately 18 kilometers (11 miles) east of Brandon.

References 

Unincorporated communities in Westman Region